Bulbophyllum pyridion is a species of orchid in the genus Bulbophyllum. It can be found in the forests of Borneo in altitudes of 1500 meters.

References

The Bulbophyllum-Checklist
The Internet Orchid Species Photo Encyclopedia

pyridion